DeKalb County Schools can refer to a U.S. public school system in several states, including:
DeKalb County School District in Georgia
DeKalb County Schools (Alabama)